Udea pseudocrocealis is a moth in the family Crambidae. It was described by South in 1901. It is found in Japan.

References

pseudocrocealis
Moths described in 1901